The Orlando Consort is a British vocal consort which is best known for performing Renaissance choral music one voice to a part. The Consort was founded in 1988 as part of the activities of the Early Music Network of Great Britain, a forerunner of the NCEM, York.

The four founding members were:
 Robert Harre-Jones (countertenor)
 Charles Daniels (tenor)
 Angus Smith (tenor)
 Donald Greig (baritone)

The four current members are:
 Matthew Venner - counter tenor
 Mark Dobell - tenor
 Angus Smith - tenor
 Donald Greig - baritone

The principal members are or were members of the Tallis Scholars, Gabrieli Consort or Taverner Consort.

The Consort has also performed and recorded with the jazz quartet Perfect Houseplants.

Discography
For Metronome, DG Archiv, Harmonia Mundi USA and Hyperion.

References

External links
Official website

Early music consorts
Musical groups established in 1988